31st Artios Awards, presented by the Casting Society of America, honoring the best originality, creativity and the contribution of casting to the overall quality of a film, television, theatre and short-form projects, was held on January 21, 2016, in simultaneous ceremonies at the Beverly Hilton Hotel, Los Angeles and Hard Rock Cafe in New York City. The New York City ceremony was hosted by Tituss Burgess, while Greg Grunberg hosted the Los Angeles ceremony.

The television, theatre and short-form projects nominations were announced on August 21, 2015. The film nominations were announced on January 8, 2016.

Winners and nominees
Winners are listed first and highlighted in boldface:

Film

Television

Short-Form Projects

Theatre

Hoyt Bowers Award
Bernard Telsey

Career Achievement Award
Danny Boyle

New York Apple Award
Michelle and Robert King

References

Artios
Artios
Artios
January 2016 events in the United States
2016 in New York City
2016 in Los Angeles
Artios Awards